Deathgate or Death Gate can refer to

 The Death Gate Cycle series of fantasy novels by Margaret Weis and Tracy Hickman.
 Death Gate, a computer adventure game loosely based on the above.